Visan Yonjan (born 2 October 1981) is a Nepali singer-songwriter. He has been the frontman for two bands, Stond Amp and Visan N' The Groovers. He began his music career in 2006. He has worked with various Nepali artists like Sabin Rai, Nima Rumba, Mingma Sherpa, Ciney Gurung, Sugam Pokharel He has performed in Nepal, Hong Kong, Thailand, China, India ( Kalimpong, Sikkim, Darjeeling, Pune).

Early life
Visan Yonjan is a son of Late Raju Yonjan and Meena Yonjan. After his graduation, he moved to Kathmandu with his family, finding musical inspiration from Bon Jovi, Sound Garden, Nirvana and Alter Bridge. Yonjan began to play gigs in local pubs inside Kathmandu city in the early period of his career. And in 2006, he released his debut album Premiere.

Recording career
2006
Visan's career began as a pop singer when he signed up with Reeyaz Music Records and recorded a debut album in 2006 that brought him further into the limelight. He wrote several songs for other artists such as Puja Rai, Raju Lama (The Angels band), Impluse 21, Astha B which were popular on TV channels.

2008 – 2010
Stoned Amp was formed in 2009, a rock band he formed with his musicians friends, Bizu Karmacharya, Roshan Lama and Sujan Rajkarnikar. Stoned Amp signed to Reeyaz Music Records, releasing a debut album self-titled 'Stoned Amp' in 2009 for they earned 11th Annual Image Award and Hits Fm Music Award nomination for best performance in group or duo and best vocal performance in 2010. On the end of 2010, Yonjan officially announced his departure from Stoned Amp, stating that due to some personal reasons and the band Stond Amp officially disbanded.

2010- present
Visan N' The Groovers Visan N The Groovers was formed in 2010 by Visan Yonjan after Stoned Amp got disbanded. They released their debut single 'Kaaran' on 14 June 2011 which was nominated in 12th Annual Image Award for the best performance in group or duo in 2011. The band's second single 'Chaahanna Ma' was released on 24 August 2012 which reached topcharts on the Nepal Mainstream Rock band. They released their third single 'Jiwan ko paanama' on 5 December 2013; the single marked a change in Visan N' The Groovers's music in a slightly more glam/melo rock influenced direction. On 8 May 2016, Visan N' The Groovers has released their latest single 'Adrishya' from Inline Creation Records.

Albums
Premiere 2006 (Reeyaz Records)
Stond Amp 2009 (Reeyaz Records)

Singles
2011 : Kaaran.
2012 : Preyesi, Chahanna ma.
2013 : Aama, Jiwan ko paanama & Adrishya.

External links

References

1981 births
Living people
21st-century Nepalese male singers
Nepalese pop singers
People from Myagdi District
Tamang people